2008 Emperor's Cup Final was the 88th final of the Emperor's Cup competition. The final was played at National Stadium in Tokyo on January 1, 2009. Gamba Osaka won the championship.

Match details

See also
2008 Emperor's Cup

References

Emperor's Cup
2008 in Japanese football
Gamba Osaka matches
Kashiwa Reysol matches